The Mad Night (French: La folle nuit) is a 1932 French comedy film directed by Robert Bibal.

The film's sets were designed by the art director Robert-Jules Garnier.

Cast
 Suzanne Bianchetti 
 Colette Broïdo 
 Marguerite Deval as Mme Maclovie  
 Max-Georges Lafon 
 Guy Parzy

References

Bibliography 
 Crisp, Colin. Genre, Myth and Convention in the French Cinema, 1929-1939. Indiana University Press, 2002.

External links 
 

1932 films
1932 comedy films
French comedy films
1930s French-language films
Films directed by Robert Bibal
French films based on plays
French black-and-white films
1930s French films